The List of Tibco–Silicon Valley Bank riders contains riders from the team which have had the names PABW Powered by TIBCO, Team Tibco, Team TIBCO–To The Top, Team TIBCO–SVB and presently, .

2006 (PABW Powered by TIBCO) 
Ages as of 1 January 2006.

2007 (Team Tibco) 
Ages as of 1 January 2007.

2008 (Team Tibco) 
Ages as of 1 January 2008.

2009 (Team Tibco) 
Ages as of 1 January 2009.

2010 (Team TIBCO–To The Top) 
Ages as of 1 January 2010.

2011 (Team TIBCO–To The Top) 
Ages as of 1 January 2011.

2012 (Team TIBCO–To The Top)

2013 (Team TIBCO–To The Top) 
As of January 2013.

2014 (Team TIBCO–To The Top)

2015 (Team TIBCO–SVB) 
As of 10 March 2015. Ages as of 1 January 2015.

2016  (Tibco–Silicon Valley Bank)

2017 (Tibco–Silicon Valley Bank) 
Ages as of 1 January 2017.

2018 (Tibco–Silicon Valley Bank) 
Ages as of 1 January 2018.

2019 (Tibco–Silicon Valley Bank)

2020 (Tibco–Silicon Valley Bank) 
Ages as of 1 January 2020.

2021 (Tibco–Silicon Valley Bank)
Ages as at 1 January  2021.

2022 (EF Education-TIBCO-SVB)

2023 (EF Education-TIBCO-SVB)

See also

References

PABW